James J. Bremner (b. 1832) was a prominent military figure in Nova Scotia.  He was active in repelling the Fenian Raids (1866–1871). He later led Halifax Provisional Battalion to the North-West Rebellion (1886).  He was also a member of the North British Society. Sir Sandford Fleming served under him as a private.

Gallery

See also 
Military history of Nova Scotia
History of the Halifax Regional Municipality
Militia Act of 1855

References 
Texts
 David A. Sutherland. "Halifax Encounter with the North-West Uprising of 1885". Journal of the Royal Nova Scotia Historical Society. Vol. 13, 2010.
  Joseph Edwards. The Militia of Nova Scotia, 1749–1867. Collections of the Nova Scotia historical Society

Endnotes

External links 
The History of the North West Rebellion
Experience of the Halifax Battalion in the North West
History of the Halifax volunteer battalion and volunteer companies: 1859–1887 By Thomas J. Egan

History of Nova Scotia
Canadian Army
Military history of Nova Scotia
Military regiments raised in Nova Scotia
North-West Rebellion
Canadian Militia officers